"How Do I Turn You On" is a song written by Mike Reid and Robert Byrne, and recorded by the American country music singer Ronnie Milsap. It was released in October 1986 as the fourth single from the album Lost in the Fifties Tonight. The song was Milsap's thirtieth number one country single, spending one week at number one and thirteen weeks on the country chart.

Charts

References

1985 songs
Ronnie Milsap songs
1986 singles
Songs written by Robert Byrne (songwriter)
Songs written by Mike Reid (singer)
Song recordings produced by Tom Collins (record producer)
RCA Records singles